Torta can refer to:
 Torta, a Spanish word with a huge array of regional culinary meanings, from its traditional meaning of flatbread to cake 
 Torta de Gazpacho, a flatbread
 Torta, a Mexican sandwich
 Torta, a kind of Philippine omelette of ground meat and potatoes, although in Visayas and Mindanao, 'torta' refers to a sponge cake
 Torta, the Hungarian, Czech, Slovak, Bosnian, Croatian, Serbian, Italian, Portuguese and  Bulgarian word for cake, typically made with layered sponge & cream, chocolate or fruit filling
 Torta, a surname with origins in Northern Italy near Venice
 Bidens torta, the corkscrew beggartick, a plant species
 Torta, a type of lava dome erupted by volcanoes

See also
 Torte